Renaud Girard, born 25 May 1955 in New York City, is a French journalist and writer. He studied at the Ecole Normale Supérieure and the Ecole Nationale d'Administration. He has worked as a war correspondent and written books about the Middle East, geopolitics and international relations.

He is an advocate of political realism. One of his concepts is that of the "principal enemy" (ennemi principal), which constitutes a hierarchy of political priorities. For example, in the Syrian Civil War, he considers the principal enemy to be Sunni jihadists, which makes it acceptable to seek alliances with Shi'a Islamist groups such as Hezbollah. Another concept he uses is that of "blatant evil" (mal flagrant), which creates distinctions between different dictatorships. A dictatorship may be deserving of strong criticism, but at the same time not legitimize mass murder or strive for unlimited expansion, in which case it can not be considered as blatantly evil. This is exemplified by the regimes of Muammar Gaddafi, Saddam Hussein and Bashar al-Assad. On the other hand, Nazi Germany and the Islamic State of Iraq and the Levant are examples which Girard regards as blatantly evil.

Girard is very critical of the neoconservative movement and its doctrine of trying to impose democracy on other countries by force. He has argued that the United States under George W. Bush prioritized democracy in Iraq over the prospect of peace, which only lead to failure and took the country further from democracy than it was when the operation began.

Bibliography
 Pourquoi ils se battent ? : Voyage dans les guerres du Moyen-Orient, éditions Flammarion, 2005 , Prix Montyon from the Académie française
 La guerre ratée d'Israël contre le Hezbollah, éditions Perrin, 2006 
 Retour à Peshawar, éditions Grasset, 2010 
 Le Monde en marche, CNRS Éditions, 2014 
 Que reste-t-il de l'occident ?, with Régis Debray, éditions Grasset, 2014 
 Le monde en guerre. 50 clefs pour le comprendre, Carnets Nord / éditions Montparnasse, 2016.

References

External links

1955 births
20th-century French journalists
21st-century French journalists
21st-century French writers
Critics of neoconservatism
École nationale d'administration alumni
École Normale Supérieure alumni
French male non-fiction writers
French war correspondents
Geopoliticians
Journalists from New York City
Living people
Writers from New York City